Terry Jordan may refer to:

Terry Jordan (Canadian writer)
Terry Jordan (horse racing), see Dominion Day Stakes
Terry Jordan, host on WFNC (AM)
Terry G. Jordan-Bychkov (1938–2003), Author, Professor at the Department of Geography and the Environment at University of Texas at Austin.